Akyat Bahay Gang is a 1988 Filipino crime film directed by Efren C. Piñon and starring Lito Lapid, Zandro Zamora, Dick Israel, Lito Gruet, Chuck Perez, Jean Saburit, Angela Perez, and Paquito Diaz. Produced by Falcon Films, a subsidiary of Viva Films, it was released on April 20, 1988. Critic Luciano E. Soriano gave the film a negative review, criticizing its lack of suspense and unexciting action, though he noted it was better than other films showing in theaters at the time.

Cast
Lito Lapid as Ricardo "Carding" Dacanay
Zandro Zamora as Rufing
Dick Israel as Ato
Lito Gruet as Berto
Chuck Perez as Mio
Jean Saburit as Marianne
Angela Perez as Liza
Paquito Diaz as Abet Valdez
Crystal Piñon as Daisy
Peck Piñon as Mr. Allan Ang
Perry Baltazar as Morrick
Alex Bolado as Ely Valdez
Sonny Valencia as Bong Valdez
Rudy Meyer as Ramon Escudero
Eric Francisco as Rodel Dacanay
Rusty Santos as Capt. Panopio
Joey Padilla as Pat. Reyes
Leo Padilla as Lt. Nicolas

Production
Akyat Bahay Gang was the last film Angela Perez starred in before retiring from the film industry to raise a family.

Release
Akyat Bahay Gang was graded "B" by the Movie and Television Review and Classification Board (MTRCB), indicating a "good" quality. The film was released on April 20, 1988.

Critical response
Luciano E. Soriano, writing for the Manila Standard, gave the film a negative review, criticizing the heist scenes for lacking in suspense and the action for being unexciting, along with some inconsistencies in logic for character actions. However, Soriano considers Akyat Bahay Gang to be better than Urban Terrorist and Gorio Punasan, Rebel Driver which opened around the same time.

References

External links

1988 films
1980s crime action films
Filipino-language films
Films about bank robbery
Philippine crime action films